Sideras is a village and a community of the Kozani municipality. Before the 2011 local government reform it was part of the municipality of Dimitrios Ypsilantis, of which it was a municipal district. The 2011 census recorded 131 inhabitants in the community. The community of Sideras covers an area of 28.554 km2. The small settlement of Ktenas, which was uninhabited between about 1975 and 2005, belongs to the community of Sideras.

The village was named Demirciler (Eng. "smiths") by Turkish inhabitants until the 1924 population exchange between Greece and Turkey.

See also
List of settlements in the Kozani regional unit

References

Populated places in Kozani (regional unit)